Robert Carr Dynes (born November 8, 1942) is a Canadian-American physicist, researcher, and academic administrator, and professor of physics at the University of California, Berkeley, and the former President of the University of California system, and former Chancellor of the University of California San Diego.

Biography

Early years
Dynes was born in Ontario, Canada, where he earned a bachelor's degree in mathematics and physics from the University of Western Ontario in 1964. He then earned master's (1965) and doctorate (1968) degrees in physics from McMaster University.  He became a naturalized United States citizen in 1984.

Career 
Dynes worked at Bell Laboratories from 1964 to 1990, studying semiconductors and superconductors.  He then became professor of physics at the University of California San Diego (UCSD), in 1991.  In 1996 he became Chancellor of the UCSD campus, then in 2003 was chosen to be the 18th President of the University of California system.

Dynes' scientific honors include the 1990 Fritz London Memorial Prize in Low Temperature Physics and his 2001 election to the Council of the National Academy of Sciences, a society to which he was elected in 1989.

Dynes is a fellow of the American Physical Society (1981), the Canadian Institute for Advanced Research, and the American Academy of Arts and Sciences.  
Dynes remains active in his research and heads a modest sized low temperature physics laboratory at Berkeley.

After five tumultuous years as President of UC, filled with compensation scandals, the suicide of UCSC Chancellor Denice Denton and other challenges, on August 13, 2007, Dynes announced he would resign his position as the President of the University of California to return to his teaching position and spend time with his new wife, Ann Parode. He resigned on August 16. 2007, and was replaced by Mark Yudof, formerly chancellor of the University of Texas.

In November 2008, Dynes' close aide and his UC Associate President Linda Morris Williams was awarded a controversial pay out  and re-hired as an Associate Chancellor at University of California, Berkeley by Chancellor Robert Birgeneau. This event led President Mark Yudof to make changes to the buy out program.

Personal life
Dynes naturalized to the United States in 1984. He married Cristel Dynes in 1968 and they divorced in January 1998. He married a physics professor, Frances Hellman, in May 1998 and they divorced in 2006. He married a former UCSD legal counsel and UC Associate of the President, Ann Parode, in March 2007.

References

Notes

External links
Oral history interview transcript with Robert Dynes on 30 March 2020, American Institute of Physics, Niels Bohr Library & Archives
Biography of Robert C. Dynes
Homepage of Robert C. Dynes at UC San Diego

1942 births
Living people
21st-century American physicists
Canadian physicists
Canadian emigrants to the United States
McMaster University alumni
Members of the United States National Academy of Sciences
People from London, Ontario
University of California regents
University of California, Berkeley College of Letters and Science faculty
University of California, San Diego faculty
Chancellors of the University of California, San Diego
University of Western Ontario alumni
Presidents of the University of California System
Fellows of the American Physical Society
Hellman family